Gugchin (also Romanized as Gūgchīn; also known as Gūgchī and Gukchin) is a village in Kahshang Rural District, in the Central District of Birjand County, South Khorasan Province, Iran. At the 2016 census, its population was 190, in 75 families.

References 

Populated places in Birjand County